Claes Robert Herman Vidarsson Egnell (29 January 1916 – 15 January 2012) was a Swedish sport shooter and modern pentathlete, who competed at the 1948 and 1952 Summer Olympics. In 1948 he finished 24th in the 25 m rapid-fire pistol event. In 1952 he won a silver medal in modern pentathlon with the Swedish team, and placed 11th individually. He also took part in the 1948 Winter Olympics, in the winter pentathlon, which was held as a demonstration sport. He suffered a leg fracture in the downhill skiing event and had to withdraw.

Egnell also competed nationally in fencing, cross-country skiing, tennis and horse riding. In 1945 he received the Svenska Dagbladet Gold Medal for winning two Swedish modern pentathlon championships. He served as Secretary-General of the FIS Nordic World Ski Championships 1974 and was a guest of honor at the modern pentathlon World Cup final in Uppsala in 2005.

References

1916 births
2012 deaths
Sportspeople from Örebro
Swedish male modern pentathletes
Swedish male sport shooters
Olympic modern pentathletes of Sweden
Olympic shooters of Sweden
Shooters at the 1948 Summer Olympics
Modern pentathletes at the 1952 Summer Olympics
Olympic silver medalists for Sweden
Olympic medalists in modern pentathlon
Medalists at the 1952 Summer Olympics